Diles Creek is a stream in Randolph County, Arkansas and Oregon County, Missouri. It is a tributary of Eleven Point River.

Diles Creek has the name of the local Diles family.

See also
List of rivers of Arkansas
List of rivers of Missouri

References

Rivers of Randolph County, Arkansas
Rivers of Oregon County, Missouri
Rivers of Arkansas
Rivers of Missouri